Oleksiy Oleksandrovych Mykhaylychenko (born 30 March 1963) is a Ukrainian football coach and former professional player. He is a Distinguished Master of Sports of the USSR and a Distinguished Coach of Ukraine. During his playing days he was a versatile midfielder known for his stamina and passing capability. Also noted for his technique, Mykhaylychenko usually played as central attacking midfielder.

Mykhaylychenko currently holds an administrative position at his home club, Dynamo Kyiv, as director of sport. His name is commonly romanised as Alexei Mikhailichenko from the Russian spelling of his name (Алексей Александрович Михайличенко).

Mykhaylychenko played for Dynamo Kyiv, Sampdoria and Rangers. He then became a coach, starting with assistant coach to Dynamo Kyiv's legendary Valeriy Lobanovsky. Following the death of Lobanovsky, Mykhaylychenko replaced him as head coach. In 2004, he took charge of the Ukraine's national under-21 team. He was head coach of the Ukraine national football team senior side for two years after that.

Club career
Mykhaylychenko began his football career in the youth system of Dynamo Kyiv, under the guidance of Anatoliy Byshovets. He made his debut in the Soviet Top League in 1981, and went on to have a great career with Dynamo, winning four championships and three runner-up medals. He also won the Soviet Cup three times. His biggest success with Dynamo came when they won the 1985–86 European Cup Winners' Cup. He was awarded the Soviet Footballer of the Year award in 1988, as well as two Ukrainian Footballer of the Year awards in 1987 and 1988. In 1990, he was signed by the Italian club Sampdoria, who won their first Serie A title that season.

The following season he moved to play with the Scottish Premier Division team Rangers, uniting with fellow Ukrainian and Dynamo Kyiv teammate Oleh Kuznetsov, although the defender had a long-term injury problem and they only played together 20 times in Scotland. His first season at Ibrox was undoubtedly his most successful, as they completed the double of the Premier Division title and Scottish Cup and Mykhaylychenko was a regular in the side with 10 goals from 27 league games. He featured in 29 league games as Rangers won a domestic treble a year later, but managed just five goals. He was an even more frequent selection in the first team during 1993–94, playing 34 games, but again scored only five times.

Despite being very successful as a creative and technical central midfielder earlier in his career, at Rangers he was often deployed on the left wing with less impact as manager Walter Smith preferred a 4–4–2 formation with more combative players in the central roles. Then came the arrival of wide man Brian Laudrup, whose presence in the team restricted Mykhaylychenko to a mere nine league appearances and two goals in 1994–95. He made 11 goalless league appearances in the 1995–96 (during which Wolverhampton Wanderers made an unsuccessful approach for him) and remained in Glasgow until retiring from playing in May 1996 at the age of 33.

With Rangers, Mykhaylychenko managed to win another five league winner's medals. All-in-all he won championship medals in three different nations, and for seven consecutive seasons – USSR in 1990, Italy in 1991 and Scotland from 1992 to 1996.

International career
At national level, in 1983 Mykhaylychenko took part in the 'Summer Spartakiad of the Peoples of the USSR' in the team of Ukrainian Republic team.

Mykhaylychenko was capped 36 times (scoring nine goals) for the USSR. His first game for the Soviet team was on 29 April 1987 at home against East Germany. He won the gold medal at the 1988 Summer Olympics, and was part of the silver medal-winning Soviet squad at Euro 1988, but injury deprived him of a place in the FIFA World Cup 1990 squad and he was sorely missed as the Soviets crashed out in the first round.

Mykhaylychenko also played at the Euro 1992 championship with the CIS (appearing for the interim team five times in total) and afterwards played twice for Ukraine, making his debut on 28 October 1992 against Belarus, aged 29.

Coaching
After retiring from playing in 1996, Mykhaylychenko went back to Ukraine to begin coaching under the legendary Kyiv manager Valeri Lobanovsky, remaining his assistant for five years. When Lobanovsky died in 2002, Mykhaylychenko took over as caretaker manager before assuming full control of the team in the 2002–03 season. Mikhailichenko led the team to two league titles and the 2003 Ukrainian Cup, but was replaced in August 2004. In 2004, he became the head coach of the Ukraine under-21 team. In that capacity he led the team to the final of the 2006 European Championship, which they lost to Netherlands.

On 16 June 2006, it was reported that Mikhailichenko would take over as head coach of Scottish Premier League club, Heart of Midlothian. Hearts did not follow up their reported interest and instead appointed caretaker Valdas Ivanauskas on a full-time basis. Mikhailichenko was announced as head coach of the Ukraine national team on 11 January 2008. After Mikhailichenko's contract expired on in December 2009 the Football Federation of Ukraine did not renew the contract after the national team failed to qualify for the 2010 World Cup in South Africa.

Mykhaylychenko took over again as head coach of Dynamo Kyiv in August 2019. He was released from his duties on 20 July 2020, after winning the Ukrainian Cup and reaching second place in the championship. The club's official website cited playing level and the lack of progress as main reasons for his departure.

In May 2021, became Vice-President of the Ukrainian Association of Football, promoted by the commander of Andriy Pavelka, who will be pratsyuvati in the UAF.

Career statistics

International

International goals
Score and results list Soviet Union's goal tally first

Honours

Club

Dynamo Kyiv
 Soviet Top League: 1981, 1985, 1986, 1990
 Soviet Cup: 1985, 1987, 1990
 European Cup Winners' Cup: 1985–86

Sampdoria
 Italian Serie A: 1990–91

Rangers
 Scottish Premier Division: 1991–92, 1992–93, 1993–94, 1994–95, 1995–96
 Scottish Cup: 1991–92
 Scottish League Cup: 1992–93, 1993–94

International

Soviet Union
 Olympic champion:  Gold Medal 1988
 European Football Championship Runner-up: 1988

Individual
 Ukrainian Footballer of the Year: 1987, 1988
 Soviet Footballer of the Year: 1988
Ballon d'Or:
1988 – 4th
1989 – 12th
1991 – 21st

Manager

Dynamo Kyiv
 Ukrainian Premier League: 2002–03, 2003–04
Runner-up 2001–02, 2019–20
 Ukrainian Cup: 2002–03, 2019–20
 Ukrainian Super Cup: 2004

Ukraine under-21s
 UEFA Under-21 Championship: runner-up 2006

References

External links
 
 
 

1963 births
Living people
Soviet footballers
Soviet expatriate footballers
Ukrainian footballers
Ukrainian expatriate footballers
Soviet Union international footballers
Ukraine international footballers
Dual internationalists (football)
Ukrainian football managers
Ukraine national football team managers
Ukraine national under-21 football team managers
FC Dynamo Kyiv players
U.C. Sampdoria players
Rangers F.C. players
Soviet Top League players
Serie A players
Scottish Football League players
Expatriate footballers in Italy
Expatriate footballers in Scotland
Footballers at the 1988 Summer Olympics
Olympic footballers of the Soviet Union
Olympic gold medalists for the Soviet Union
UEFA Euro 1988 players
UEFA Euro 1992 players
FC Dynamo Kyiv managers
Footballers from Kyiv
Olympic medalists in football
Ukrainian Premier League managers
Medalists at the 1988 Summer Olympics
Soviet expatriate sportspeople in Italy
Soviet expatriate sportspeople in Scotland
Ukrainian expatriate sportspeople in Scotland
Association football midfielders
Recipients of the Order of Friendship of Peoples
Recipients of the Order of Merit (Ukraine), 1st class
Recipients of the Order of Merit (Ukraine), 2nd class
Recipients of the Order of Merit (Ukraine), 3rd class